Flávio de Oliveira Godoy (born 13 December 1969 in Petrópolis) is a retired Brazilian athlete who competed mostly in the 400 and 800 metres. He represented his country at the 1996 Summer Olympics, failing to qualify for the semifinals. He also competed at the 1997 World Indoor Championships and 2001 World Championships in addition to many medals at regional level.

Competition record

Personal bests
Outdoor
400 metres – 45.56 (Rio de Janeiro 2001)
800 metres – 1:46.22 (São Leopoldo 1998)
Indoor
800 metres – 1:49.93 (Paris 1997)

References

1969 births
Living people
Brazilian male sprinters
Brazilian male middle-distance runners
Athletes (track and field) at the 1996 Summer Olympics
Olympic athletes of Brazil
People from Petrópolis
Sportspeople from Rio de Janeiro (state)
20th-century Brazilian people
21st-century Brazilian people